The median plane also called a mid-sagittal plane is used to describe the sagittal plane as it bisects the body vertically through the midline marked by the navel, dividing the body exactly in left and right side.
The term parasagittal plane is used to refer to any plane parallel to the sagittal and median plane.

It is one of the lines used to define the right upper quadrant of the human abdomen.

The midsternal line can be interpreted as a segment of the median plane.

Abdomen